is a railway station in the city of Tsuruoka, Yamagata, Japan, operated by East Japan Railway Company (JR East).

Lines
Atsumi Onsen Station is served by the Uetsu Main Line, and is located  rail kilometers from the terminus of the line at Niitsu Station.

Station layout
Atsumi Onsen Station has a single island platform and a side platform, serving three tracks. The platforms are connected to the station building by an underground passageway. The station has a Midori no Madoguchi staffed ticket office.

Platforms

History
A new station building was completed in December 1963. The station was renamed Atsumi Onsen Station on October 1, 1977. With the privatization of JNR on April 1, 1987, the station came under the control of JR East.

Passenger statistics
In fiscal 2018, the station was used by an average of 101 passengers daily (boarding passengers only). The passenger figures for previous years are as shown below.

Surrounding area
Atsumi Onsen

See also
List of railway stations in Japan

References

External links

 JR East Station information 

Stations of East Japan Railway Company
Railway stations in Yamagata Prefecture
Uetsu Main Line
Railway stations in Japan opened in 1923
Tsuruoka, Yamagata